Wiktor Podoski (24 May 1901 – 10 July 1970) was a Polish painter. His work was part of the art competitions at the 1932 Summer Olympics and the 1936 Summer Olympics. He was not prolific, but his work is well-regarded.

References

External links
 

1901 births
1970 deaths
20th-century Polish painters
20th-century Polish male artists
Olympic competitors in art competitions
Artists from Ternopil
Polish male painters